Richman is a series of digital board games created and published by Taiwanese game developer company Softstar Entertainment.

Gameplay
Similarly to the Monopoly board game, players must gain the most wealth and/or bankrupt other players as they traverse in a game map, filled with property plots and other special tiles. The goal is achieved mainly by purchasing property and receiving rent from opponents, or investing in a simulated stock market. The gameplay usually also features a selection of minigames, special items, and random events that can change the standings.

In Richman Fight, players need to choose different characters and prepare 8 function cards in repeat deck before starting a game. After the game start, players need to use a dice to control their chosen character in the map and make the opponents bankrupt through the effects of function cards, construct the special property, and release the character's ability. And also players can earn cards or trigger effects in different special blocks on a map to help them win a game.

History
Richman 8, released in 2006, was claimed to be the last main series Richman game, as a consequence of "shrinking single-player markets and lack of breakthrough in gameplay". However, spin-off titles including Richman 4 Fun for iOS and Android platforms and Richman WEB were released after that. A Beijing subsidiary of Softstar has also licensed the development of a mobile-only Richman 9 to a Hangzhou company.

Releases
Richman
Richman 2
Richman 3
Richman 4
Richman 5
Richman 6
Richman 7
Richman 8
Richman 9
Richman 10
Richman 11
Richman 4 Fun
Richman Online
Richman WEB
Richman Fight

See also
Monopoly (game)
Fortune Street, another series of similar video games

References

External links
 Softstar's official Richman website 
Digital board games
Multiplayer video games
Video games developed in Taiwan